Catherine Chau is a Hong Kong actress. She started by completing the 1996 TVB Acting Class and graduating in 1998. She was nominated for Most Improved Female Artist at the TVB Anniversary Awards (2009). Her notable roles include The Dance of Passion (2006), My Sister of Eternal Flower (2011), Men with No Shadows (2011) and The Menu (2015).

Filmography

Television dramas

Films

References

External links
 
 Catherine Chau on Sina Weibo

20th-century Hong Kong actresses
21st-century Hong Kong actresses
1979 births
Living people